Prosena siberita is a species of fly in the family Tachinidae.

Distribution
This species is present in most of Europe, Central Asia, Japan, Mongolia, China, Russia, Transcaucasia, India, Indonesia, Malaysia, Myanmar, Nepal, Philippines, Ryukyu Islands, Sri Lanka, Taiwan, Australia and New Caledonia. It has been introduced and established in United States. The earliest introduction occurred in 1925, when numerous specimens were released in New Jersey for the purpose of establishing a local population to combat the spread of the Japanese beetle.

Description

These flies have a grey dusted, fuscous or testaceour body. In males the abdomen is largely testaceous, while in females it is fuscous, densely grey dusted. Thorax shows some yellowish hairs. They have a very long and slender proboscis that they keep hinged under the body. The length of the proboscis is longer than the height of the head. Palpi are highly reduced. Eyes arereddish-brown and  bare. Femora are reddish. Wings are hyaline, yellowish-brown at the base.

Biology
Prosena siberita is a univoltine species. Adults are harmless nectar feeders on flowers of various plants (Clematis gouriana, Gnaphalium sp., Tecoma castanifolia, Seseli libanotis, Patrinia scabiosifolia, etc.). Their larvae parasitize the larvae of various Sericini, Melolonthini and Anomalini scarab beetles (Popillia japonica, Adoretus, Anomala, Leucopholis species).

Bibliography
James E. O'Hara, Hiroshi Shima, & Chuntian Zhang. "Annotated Catalogue of the Tachinidae (Insecta: Diptera) of China." Zootaxa 2190 (2009): 1–236.
Sabrosky and Arnaud, in Stone et al., 1965, Catalog of the Diptera of America north of Mexico, p. 987.

References

Diptera of Europe
Dexiinae
Insects described in 1775
Articles containing video clips
Taxa named by Johan Christian Fabricius